The Lancaster Canal Tramroad, also known as the Walton Summit Tramway or the Old Tram Road, was a British plateway, completed in 1803, to link the north and south ends of the Lancaster Canal across the Ribble valley (Barritt, 2000), pending completion of the canal.  The canal link was never constructed.

History

The Lancaster Canal Company obtained an Act of Parliament (32 Geo. III c. 101) in 1792 to construct a canal linking the towns of Kendal, Lancaster and Preston to the coalfields around Wigan.  Coal was to be the chief traffic northwards and limestone southwards. Most of the canal was completed quickly, including the impressive aqueduct across the River Lune near Lancaster, but the part across the wide valley of the River Ribble remained to be built when the construction capital became exhausted.

The original plan foresaw an impressive stone aqueduct across the river and up to 32 locks to complete the route.  As a temporary measure, the canal company constructed a tramroad to link the two halves and allow revenue traffic to start flowing.  Construction took three years.

The tramroad

In 1794, the canal company engaged the services of William Cartwright, first to supervise the construction of the foundations for the Lune Aqueduct and later as Resident Engineer. John Rennie and William Jessop were the chief engineers to the company, but such was the demand for their services at this time of Canal Mania that they were much in demand elsewhere and Cartwright was solely responsible for the construction of the tramroad.  His house in Preston is still extant and now forms the façade of a new shopping arcade.

The five-mile-long tramroad comprised a double-track plateway, except for a short section of single track through a tunnel under Fishergate in Preston, just south of the canal basin.  The iron rails were 'L' shaped in section and were spiked to large limestone blocks.  The wheels on the wagons were not flanged and it was the vertical section on the iron rails that kept the wheels on the track.  The gauge was 4 foot 3 inches (1295 mm) between the verticals, which were on the inside of the track.

The wagons were pulled by horses, up to six at a time, and each wagon had a capacity of two tons.  Originally there were three inclined planes where the wagons were hauled by stationary steam engines and a continuous chain.

The tramroad crossed the River Ribble on a timber trestle bridge.  This structure outlived the tramroad by nearly one hundred years and still stands today albeit with heavy modifications (including the replacement of the wooden trestles with precast concrete ones in 1938 and the bridge deck with prestressed precast concrete in the mid sixties).

There were many accidents during the life of the tramroad, many involving the inclined planes with wagons running away.

As was common on early 'railway' systems, the wagons could be privately owned by the hauliers themselves (known locally as halers) who paid the company a toll to use the tramroad.  The last haler to work the tramroad, John Procter, walked the 10-mile return journey twice a day for 32 years.  It has been estimated that he walked or rode nearly  during his career on the tramroad, and needed his clogs resoling once per week.

Decline and closure

In 1813, estimates were prepared to replace the tramroad by a canal but the cost of £160,000 was too much for the company at the time.  In 1831 the coming of the Preston and Wigan Railway sounded the death knell for the tramroad and proposals were made to convert it into a railway or amalgamate with the new railway company.  This never happened and the tramroad became embroiled in the railway politics of the day.

In 1837 the new Bolton and Preston Railway leased the tramroad as a potential alternative route into Preston that avoided the rival North Union Railway. However, an agreement was concluded between the two parties before this proved necessary.  Nevertheless, the lease arrangements were incorporated into the Bolton and Preston Railway’s Act of Parliament and the ownership of the tramroad passed to the railway.  In 1844 the Bolton and Preston merged with the rival North Union Railway and shortly afterwards a branch line to the canal basin in Preston was built.  This created a railhead for Wigan coal in Preston and removed the raison d’être of the tramroad.

Although the North Union wanted to close the tramroad immediately the canal company objected and they were forced to maintain it in an increasingly decrepit state until the Lancaster Canal Transfer Act of 1864 provided for the canal north of Preston to be leased in perpetuity to the railway and that south of Walton Summit to be leased to the Leeds and Liverpool Canal.  The Act also allowed closure of the tramroad between Preston and Bamber Bridge.

In 1872, a land exchange between Preston Corporation and the railway saw the formation between Preston and Carr Wood pass into municipal ownership.  This part, including the tramroad bridge over the River Ribble, was turned into a footpath, which remains to the present day.

A further Act in 1879 enabled the last part of the tramroad between Bamber Bridge and Walton Summit, to be closed.  The north end of the canal was eventually sold to the London & North Western Railway and the Lancaster Canal Company was wound up at the beginning of 1886.

Preserved remains

A well-preserved section of track from the south side of the McKenzie Inn on Station Road in Bamber Bridge was taken up and relaid in Worden Park in Leyland. Plates and stone sleepers are in South Ribble Museum in Leyland and the Harris Museum in Preston. The Harris Museum also has a model of a wagon and a wheel and axle of a wagon recovered from the bed of the River Ribble (Clegg et al., 2001).  They had lain there since an accident involving the failure of the endless chain on the Avenham Incline, which caused a train of wagons to run away and plunge into the river at the bottom.

A later (>1885?) enlargement of the tunnel under Fishergate (Moss, 1968) continues in use for vehicle access to the Fishergate Shopping Centre car park – it formerly accessed the Lancashire and Yorkshire Railway's Butler Street goods yard (Biddle, 1989). Part of a support for a bridge over Garden Street remains. A path on the northern edge of Avenham Park follows the route of the tramway, down the Avenham Incline and over the River Ribble on the unique concrete trestle and spar bridge that still retains structural features of the original wooden structure. The footpath continues along the flood plain embankment to the Penwortham Incline.

In February 2019, the tram bridge was closed when an inspection revealed cracks putting the bridge at risk of collapse.

Notes

See also

Canals of the United Kingdom
History of the British canal system

References

 Barritt, S. (2000) The Old Tramroad – Walton Summit to Preston Basin, Carnegie Publishing, 
 Biddle, G. (1963) "The Lancaster Canal Tramroad", Journal of the Railway & Canal Historical Society, 9 (5 & 6), p. 88-97
 Biddle, G. (1989) The Railways Around Preston – A Historical Review, Scenes From The Past 6, Foxline Publishing, 
 Clegg, J., Fazackerly, C. and Ribble Link Trust Ltd (2001) Introduction and historical background, Ribble Link Trust Ltd, website, accessed 27 November 2006
 Engineering Timelines (2007) Old Tram Bridge, Preston, Timeline Item Online, accessed 30 September 2007
 Gibbs, W.M. (1970) Walton Summit and branch canal : the last phase, Lostock Hall: W.M. Gibbs, 
 Hadfield, C. and Biddle, G. (1970a) "The Lancaster Canal", In: The Canals of North West England, Ch. 8, Newton Abbot: David & Charles, 1, p. 182-211, 
 Hadfield, C. and Biddle, G. (1970b) "The Lancaster", In: The Canals of North West England, Ch. 17, Newton Abbot: David & Charles, 2, p. 417-429, 
 Moss, I.P. (1968) Farewell to the Summit: historical notes to accompany a visit to the Walton Summit Branch of the Leeds and Liverpool Canal and the Lancaster Canal Tramway made by members and friends of the North Western Group on May 4th, [sic] 1968, Railway & Canal Historical Society (Northwest Group), 12 p.
 Philpotts, R. (1983) "Completion", In: Building the Lancaster Canal, Ch. 6, London: Blackwater, p. 40-43, 
 Stretton, C.E. (1893) The history of the Preston and Walton Summit plate-way. A paper read 1st June 1883, Stretton Collection : Chicago Exhibition, n.p., 10 p.

External links

 The Lancaster Canal, History and Information
 "The Old Tram Road" at Winckley Square – Preston – Lancashire (select History > The Old Tram Road from left-hand panel)
 Old Tramway Cycle Route
 South Ribble Borough Council Museum, Leyland

Historic transport in Lancashire
Lancaster Canal
South Ribble
Transport in Preston
Horse-drawn railways
Railway lines opened in 1803
Railway lines closed in 1879
Bridges across the River Ribble